Invasion of the Dinosaurs, simply titled Invasion in Part One, is the second serial of the 11th season of the British science fiction television series Doctor Who, which was first broadcast in six weekly parts on BBC1 from 12 January to 16 February 1974.

Set in London, the serial involves Member of Parliament (MP) Sir Charles Grover (Noel Johnson) and General Finch (John Bennett) conspiring to roll the Earth back in time to the "golden age" when it was untouched by humanity. This is the last story from the Pertwee era to contain an episode that was colourised from a black and white telerecording after the original colour version was irretrievably lost.

Plot
The Third Doctor and Sarah Jane Smith arrive in a deserted London, where they discover that dinosaurs are inexplicably appearing all over the city, causing havoc, but no one can account for their sudden appearances and disappearances.

The Doctor suspects that someone is deliberately tampering with time and with the help of his colleagues at UNIT, he starts to formulate a plan. They are introduced to Sir Charles Grover MP, and General Finch. In a hidden laboratory, Professor Whitaker is operating secret Timescoop technology. The dinosaurs are being used to compel the authorities to evacuate the city. It turns out that Whitaker is being aided by a disillusioned Captain Yates.

Sarah conducts her own investigations, but is captured by Grover, who is in league with Whitaker. She awakens and is astounded to find herself on a vast spaceship. The crew explain that they are en route to a distant Earth-like planet, explaining that Mankind can begin again on "New Earth", closer to nature and without the overpopulation and pollution of Earth. When Sarah tries to explain that they're still on Earth, they condemn Sarah to be re-educated into thinking the way they do.

Operation Golden Age is revealed to be a broad conspiracy including Mike Yates of UNIT, with Whitaker, Grover and Finch as its coordinators. They have emptied London, so that the chosen people on the "spacecraft" (a dummy ship hidden in a bunker under London) will be the only people within range of the Timescoop when it's activated. Whitaker has discovered how to reverse time, so that only the chosen elite will ever have existed.

Meanwhile, Sarah escapes from the bunker, but is apprehended by Finch. Her escape alerts some of the passengers to the deception. Yates reveals their plans to the Doctor, Benton and the Brigadier. Yates is overpowered, and when Finch tries to stop the Doctor and the Brigadier's efforts, Benton incapacitates him in a struggle.

The Doctor and the Brigadier confront Grover and Whitaker, just as the duped environmentalists from the fake ship arrive and demand an explanation. The Timescoop is activated, but, as the Doctor is a Time Lord, the machine's effect on him is limited, allowing him to switch the device off. Finch is arrested and court martialled, and Grover tries to use it again, but, as the Doctor has reversed the machine's polarity, it sends only itself, Whitaker and Grover into the past.

Production
Working titles for this story included Bridgehead from Space and Timescoop.  The story title of the first episode was contracted to Invasion in the opening title sequence, in an attempt to conceal the central plot device of dinosaurs. However, this was undermined by the BBC listings magazine Radio Times, which carried a picture of a dinosaur in the listing for episode one.

Malcolm Hulke protested against the use of the title Invasion of the Dinosaurs, preferring the original working title of Timescoop, and felt the contraction for the first episode was silly, especially because the Radio Times gave the game away. In a response letter after transmission, script editor Terrance Dicks pointed out that all the titles used for the project had originated in the Doctor Who production office. He agreed that the contraction to Invasion was a decision he now regretted but noted that "Radio Times are a law unto themselves".

In the novelisation, adapted by Malcolm Hulke from his own scripts, no reference is made to the "Whomobile" (which was a prop contributed to the production at a late stage by actor Jon Pertwee). In the novel, the Doctor uses a military motorbike with electronic scanning equipment attached, as in the original scripts.

Locations used in London included: Moorgate Underground Station, Smithfield Market, Westminster Bridge, Whitehall, Trafalgar Square, Haymarket, Covent Garden, Southall and Wimbledon Common. Location filming took place in September 1973, with studio recording commencing in October and November.

The producer of the series, Barry Letts, was very disappointed with the realisation of the dinosaurs and stated in an interview in 2004 that this was the story he would most like to remake with modern technology.

Missing episodes & archive
All episodes of this story except Part One exist on original format PAL colour master tapes, with the first episode only existing as a monochrome 16mm film print, the only Pertwee Era episode to remain in black and white. It was returned to the BBC by Ian Levine in June 1983 after being retained by him for 2 years for use as a bargaining chip in case another, more valuable, missing episode showed up.  There is a long-standing fan myth that the tape of Part One was erased by mistake, having been confused with an episode of the Patrick Troughton serial The Invasion. In fact, BBC Enterprises issued specific instructions to wipe all six episodes of Invasion of the Dinosaurs, named as such, in August 1974, just six months after the story's transmission; for reasons unknown, however, only Part One was actually wiped. Stickers on the cans for the remaining episodes 2–6 indicate that they were returned from BBC Wales, which was transmitting Season 11 in a different timeslot on Sunday.  As far as the BBC was concerned, the story had been wiped in its entirety; researchers for the 1977 BBC documentary Whose Doctor Who found that none of the episodes were listed as existing in the BBC library.

A black-and-white film print exists of the filmed sequences for Part One. This includes one scene of a scared scavenger stealing money from a dead milkman's satchel that was omitted from the broadcast version; this would have formed part of the deserted London montage. Black-and-white prints were used for practice by BBC film editors, in deciding where to make cuts, before cutting the master colour negatives. The surviving film recording of Episode 1 is the only telerecording of a Season 11 episode held in the archives; this is probably due to the long-standing practice within BBC Enterprises of making a film print for overseas sales purposes prior to wiping any master tape. Colour 35mm film sequences from Episode 5 also exist. The first edit of Part Three, without sound effects or incidental music on the soundtrack (known within the BBC as a "71 edit"), also exists.

Cast notes
John Bennett later returned to Doctor Who as Li H'sen Chang in The Talons of Weng-Chiang (1977). Peter Miles also appeared in Doctor Who in other roles in Doctor Who and the Silurians (1970) and Genesis of the Daleks (1975), and in the radio serial Paradise of Death. Martin Jarvis had earlier appeared as Hilio in The Web Planet (1965) and later appeared as the Governor of Varos in Vengeance on Varos (1985). Carmen Silvera had previously appeared in The Celestial Toymaker (1966).

Broadcast and reception

After the episodes were broadcast, many younger viewers of the show complained that the Tyrannosaurus Rex was actually an Allosaurus.

In The Discontinuity Guide (1998), Paul Cornell, Martin Day, and Keith Topping noted that "the special effects are woeful" and there was some padding, but the story "has many redeeming features, most notably the sombre location footage in the first episode". David J. Howe and Stephen James Walker in their analysis in Doctor Who: The Television Companion, felt that unfortunately the "awfulness of the dinosaur scenes tends to overshadow the excellence of Paddy Russell's direction of the rest of the story and the high quality of the performances by the assembled cast". Though they were favourable towards the plot, they noted that "the story is poorly paced and contains a tremendous amount of padding".

In 2010, Mark Braxton of Radio Times awarded it three stars out of five, describing it as "a roaringly good script" and he also praised the casting, but he criticised the dinosaurs as "dire" and questioned the "grand plan" which "raises all sorts of questions about how the new, jump-suited generation of mankind was smuggled aboard the fake spaceship, or how a big, nuclear-generator-powered underground base could be built unnoticed". DVD Talk's John Sinnott gave the story four out of five stars. Aside from the dinosaurs, he felt that the rest was "very good" with "a good amount of suspense, some nice twists", and also highlighted how the villains were "people who basically had the right ideas but that they took it way too far". SFX reviewer Ian Berriman wrote that the serial was "crammed with unlikely plot turns ... but that just makes it all the more entertaining". He noted that it was problematic to have several cliffhangers rely on the appearance of the dinosaurs due to their poor realisation, but praised Sarah's competence and involvement with the plot.

Commercial releases

In print

A novelisation of this serial, written by Malcolm Hulke, was published by Target Books in February 1976 as Doctor Who and the Dinosaur Invasion. In 1993 it was reprinted with the title Doctor Who – Invasion of the Dinosaurs, and different cover art. The novelisation features a prologue about the dinosaurs and ends with the Doctor consulting the Book of Ezekiel to determine the final fate of the Golden Age time travellers.  An unabridged reading of the novelisation by actor Martin Jarvis was released on CD in November 2007 by BBC Audiobooks.

Home media
This was the final complete story to be released by BBC Worldwide on VHS, in 2003.

The story was released on DVD in the UK on 9 January 2012 alongside the 1975 Tom Baker story The Android Invasion, together forming the U.N.I.T Files box set. The DVD features a restored black-and-white version of Episode 1 as the default and also a 'best-endeavours' attempt at colour recovery of this episode as a branched-extra feature. This serial was also released as part of the Doctor Who DVD Files in Issue 121 on 21 August 2013.

In contrast to other wiped colour episodes from the Pertwee era where the missing colour information had been inadvertently recorded on the surviving black and white film copies as a sequence of visual artefacts/dots or chroma dots, in the case of Part One of this story this information was found to be incomplete, and only the red and green colour signal information was recoverable, requiring the missing blue signal information to be obtained via other means.

The new colour version of Part One featured on the DVD thus employs approximated blue colour information, and although the outcome is not up to normal DVD quality, it gives an impression of what the episode would have looked like when originally broadcast.

References

External links

Target novelisation

On Target — Doctor Who and the Invasion of the Dinosaurs

Doctor Who serials novelised by Malcolm Hulke
Third Doctor serials
Television series about dinosaurs
1974 British television episodes